Office of Special Investigations may refer to:

 U.S. Air Force Office of Special Investigations
 Office of Special Investigations (Government Accountability Office)
 Office of Special Investigations (United States Department of Justice)

See also

 OSI (disambiguation)
 Special Investigations Unit (disambiguation)
 Special Investigations Bureau (disambiguation)
 Special Investigations Division (disambiguation)
 Special Investigations Section (disambiguation)
 Special Investigations (disambiguation)